Mesochernes is a genus of pseudoscorpions in the family Chernetidae.

References

External links 
 

Pseudoscorpion genera
Chernetidae